The Forbes list of Australia's 50 richest people is the annual survey of the fifty wealthiest people resident in Australia, published by Forbes Asia in January 2017. 

The net worth of the wealthiest individual, Gina Rinehart, was estimated to be 14.80 billion.

List of individuals

See also
 Financial Review Rich List
 Forbes list of Australia's 50 richest people

References

2017 in Australia
2017